Merkos L'Inyonei Chinuch (lit. Central Organization for Education) is the central educational arm of the Chabad-Lubavitch movement. It was founded in 1943 by the sixth Rebbe, Rabbi Yosef Yitzchok Schneersohn, who served as president, and appointed his son-in-law, Rabbi Menachem Mendel Schneerson, who would later become the seventh Rebbe, as its chairman and director. After the passing of Rabbi Yosef Yitzchok Schneersohn, Rabbi Menachem Mendel Schneerson succeeded him as president. Today, Rabbi Chaim Yehuda Krinsky serves as chairman and Rabbi Moshe Kotlarsky serves as vice-chairman.

Merkos L'Inyonei Chinuch is the official body responsible for establishing Chabad centers across the globe. Its vice-chairman Rabbi Moshe Kotlarsky oversees the global network of emissaries, approves new centers, and directs the annual international conference of Chabad emissaries.

Organizational structure

Merkos L'Inyonei Chinuch has these divisions:

Central Chabad Lubavitch Library — home to 250,000 books and over 100,000 letters, artifacts and pictures Its director is Rabbi Shalom Dovber Levine.
Chabad.org — an online repository of Jewish knowledge and information that attracts one million users per year
Jewish Educational Media (JEM) — the broadcast and film production division of the Lubavitch movement, founded in 1980
Jewish Learning Institute — provider of adult-education courses in hundreds of cities worldwide
Jewish Learning Network (Jnet) — a telephone study-partner program begun in 2005
Kehot Publication Society and Merkos Publications — were established in 1942, these publishing divisions have produced more than 100 million volumes in a dozen languages
Merkos Shlichus — is a rabbinical student visitation program, which sends hundreds of "Roving Rabbis" to strengthen Jewish awareness in communities worldwide
Merkos Suite 302 — Program development to support Shluchim and their communities, such as CKids and MyShliach. Merkos 302 also provides leadership training and workshops for emissaries new to directing Cteen chapters around the world, as well as incubating programs like Chabad Young Ambassadors, a global network of activists seeking to grow their local Jewish young-adult communities. Rabbi Mendy Kotlarsky serves as executive director.
CTeen — is the teen-focused arm of the Chabad movement and has 100,000 members worldwide. Its president is Rabbi Mendy Kotlarsky who also serves as the executive director of Merkos Suite 302, which launched Cteen in 2010. As of mid-2017, Cteen had operating chapters all around the world in cities as diverse as France, Rio de Janeiro, Leeds, Munich, Buenos Aires and New York.
National Campus Office — coordinator of Chabad on Campus, a network of Jewish Student Centers on more than 230 university campuses worldwide (as of April 2016), as well as regional Chabad-Lubavitch centers at an additional 150 universities worldwide
National Committee for the Furtherance of Jewish Education — is a charity that educates Jewish children in the United States. It was founded in 1940 by Rabbi Yosef Yitzchak Schneerson.
Office of Education (Chabad) — a guidance, training and service center for administrators, educators, students and parents of Chabad-Lubavitch educational institutions
Shluchim Exchange — an online service founded in 2005 to facilitate communication among over 1,500 Chabad shluchim
The Shluchim Office — coordinator of Chabad's worldwide shaliach program

Roving Rabbis
One of the best known divisions is the Merkos Shlichus campaign, which dispatches pairs of young rabbinical students, colloquially known as Roving Rabbis, to small and isolated Jewish communities around the world. Hundreds of rabbinical students participate in Passover and summer visitation programs, building Jewish awareness and spreading Torah knowledge. To date, the program has sent students to more than 150 countries.

The Rabbinical Student Visitation Program began in 1943, when Rabbi Schneerson dispatched the first pairs of students to ten cities in Upstate New York. Cities in California were added to the program in 1944, as were cities in the Southern United States in 1945. By 1948, the summer program numbered 20 students and 100 American cities. Students were also sent to Jewish farmers residing throughout the Northeastern United States, many of whom were European immigrants. The students were sent in pairs, usually one American student and one European-immigrant student.

In the early 1950s, the Rebbe added international destinations to the summer program, personally consulting maps and planning the itineraries.

Currently, 400 Roving Rabbis participate in the annual summer program. They distribute thousands of mezuzot, other religious articles such as tefillin and kosher food, and tens of thousands of Jewish information packets each year.

The students interact with both individuals and families. They often go door to door, teaching women how to light Shabbat candles and showing men how to put on tefillin for the first time. They speak about Jewish education, answer questions, and give bar mitzvah lessons.

Their visits are often anticipated by the local population. On their 2010 swing through the islands of Aruba, Bonaire and Curaçao, for example, the two Roving Rabbis were summoned to the office of Aruba Prime Minister Mike Eman, who is Jewish. Eman spoke with them about Jewish heritage, listened as they blew the shofar (it was the Hebrew month of Elul, when the shofar is blown daily in synagogues), and donned a pair of tefillin. After completing their visit to the islands, the students returned to the Prime Minister's office so he could put on tefillin again, and he asked them to arrange for him to have his own pair of tefillin.

The Roving Rabbis share their experiences and communicate with each other on their own blog site.

See also
 Rohr Jewish Learning Institute

References

External links 
Merkos L'Inyonei Chinuch 
 

Chabad organizations
Chabad outreach
Jewish education
Jewish organizations established in 1943
Yosef Yitzchak Schneersohn